Storeboard Media LLC is a media sales company that currently has the exclusive rights to place indoor billboards, called "StoreBoards", on the security pedestals at the entrances and exits of more than 13,725 chain drug stores across the United States, including CVS Pharmacy, Duane Reade, Kerr Drug, USA Drug, Rite Aid and K-Mart.

StoreBoards are currently in 50 states with markets including the top 50 designated marketing areas in the country and generate 1.2 billion plus monthly impressions. StoreBoards’ advertisers to date include P&G, Unilever, Hershey, Energizer, Vonage, Kraft,  Adams, L'Oréal, Maybelline, Pfizer, Redi-Clinics, Wyeth, CBS Television and CW11.

Storeboard Media LLC sells, produces, installs, and verifies StoreBoards on behalf of the retailer, as a new branding medium at the point-of-sale. StoreBoards are sold in four-week cycles to a single advertiser per store who provides their own creative content in advance. They typically feature a product or logo for branding purposes and have also been utilized extensively in New York City for the marketing of Broadway shows.

External links
  Website of StoreBoards Media LLC
 Storeboard Media Featured in New York Times
 Storeboard Media Featured In Drug Store News, July 17, 2008
 Storeboard Media Featured in Media Life, March 24, 2008
 Storeboard Media Featured in The New York Sun, February 3, 2006

References

Companies based in New York City
Marketing companies of the United States